The Collection is the second compilation album by Australian band Divinyls, released on 6 December 1993. The album does not include any of their 1980s singles, which were released on a different record label. The album failed to enter the Australian ARIA top 100.

In late 1992, the Divinyls covered The Young Rascals song, "I Ain't Gonna Eat Out My Heart Anymore", for the soundtrack to the film Buffy the Vampire Slayer. It was subsequently issued as the lead single from The Collection, in October 1992. The single peaked at No. 19 on the Australian singles charts and spent sixteen weeks in the top fifty. The second single released, "Wild Thing", was recorded for the soundtrack to the Australian comedy film Reckless Kelly (1993). The song reached No. 39 on the Australian singles charts. The third single, a cover of Roxy Music's "Love Is the Drug", was recorded for the soundtrack to Super Mario Bros.. The single failed to enter the top 100.

Track listing

Charts

References 

1993 greatest hits albums
Divinyls compilation albums
Virgin Records compilation albums